Mannheimia is a Gram-negative, anaerobic, non-spore-forming and non-motile bacterial genus from the family Pasteurellaceae.

References

Further reading 
 
 
 
 
 
 

Pasteurellales
Bacteria genera